The 4th Islamic Solidarity Games was a multinational, multi-sport event that was held in Baku, Azerbaijan from 12 to 22 May 2017. Previously the event has been held in Saudi Arabia in 2005 and Indonesia in 2013. The second event, originally scheduled to take place in October 2009 in Iran, was later rescheduled but then cancelled.

The Islamic Solidarity Sports Federation (ISSF) is responsible for the direction and control of the Islamic Solidarity Games.

Bidding
In October 2012, the National Olympic Committee of Azerbaijan submitted its bid for 2017 Islamic Solidarity Games during the 18th Islamic Solidarity Sports Federation meeting held in Jeddah, Saudi Arabia. Baku was awarded the event during the General Assembly of ISSF in 2013, which was also held in Jeddah.

Participating nations
All 56 members of the Islamic Solidarity Sports Federation participated in the Games. Due to the suspension of the Kuwait Olympic Committee, athletes from Kuwait  participated in the Games as Independent ISSF Athletes, under the flag of the Islamic Solidarity Sports Federation. Athletes and coaches will be accredited by the ISSF, they will wear ISSF uniforms and any medals won, will be done so under the ISSF banner and anthem. Along the Kuwait athletes, athletes of Libya and Sudan, were scheduled to compete under ISSF banner, but withdrew hours before the opening ceremony.

Below is a list of all the participating NOCs; the number of competitors per delegation is indicated in brackets.

Venues
There are 17 competition venues that will be used during the Games. The main stadium, known as Baku Olympic Stadium, has an all-seater capacity of 69,870 seats.

Calendar

Volunteers
Registration for Volunteers Program of Baku 2017 4th Islamic Solidarity Games was available between October 17 and December 11, 2016. Within this period the Volunteers Program had 12500 registered applicants. All the registered applicants were invited for the interview at the Volunteers Centre at Azerbaijan State Academy of Physical Education and Sports from November 7, 2016 to February 16, 2017.

The main goal of the program is to ensure Baku 2017 volunteers development, enable them to have a successful career in future, and support in achieving their long-term life goals.

Sports
24 disciplines from 21 sports were contested in this edition of Islamic Solidarity Games. Some sports also included disabled sport events such as athletics and judo.

Medal table

Marketing

Sponsors
Partners
 AZAL: Last March, Azerbaijan airlines signed a partnership with Baku 2017 Islamic Solidarity Games.
 BonAqua: Bon aqua is a brand of The Coca-Cola Company made in Azerbaijani. They officially announced their partnership with the Islamic games.
 SOCAR: On 11 April, SOCAR signed their partnership. The company committed to have a long-term partnership with the committee of the Islamic games.
 BP:On 6 February, The organizing committee signed an agreement with BP a major oil and gas company in Azerbaijan.
 MICROPLUS: Italian company committed for the Data Processing and Timing of the Baku 2017 games

Supporters
 AZ Holding Group: Milla and AZ (Azerbaijan Food and Packaging Company): The Azerbaijani company Milla is the first supporter to prolong their collaboration with the organizing committee of the Islamic games. 
 Nestlé: Nestlé Azerbaijan will also be an official supplier of the 4th Islamic solidarity games.
 Iticket AZ: Iticket.az is the official ticketing supporter of the Baku 2017 games.

Official mascots
The Azerbaijani Karabakh horses named  were announced as mascots on February 13, 2017. Inje is the name of the female version and the name Jasur was selected for the male version.

Broadcasters
List of channels will be Broadcasting the game:

  — RTA
  — RTSH
  — AzTV and Idman TV
  — BTV
  — ORTB
  — RTB
  — RTB
  — CRTV
  — ONRTV
  — RTNC
  — ERTU
  — Gabon TV
  — GRTS
  — RTG Conarky
  — Guinea Bisau TV
  — NCNTV11
  — TVRI, RCTI And Global TV (Indonesia) 
  — IRIB Varzesh
  — RTI
  — KBC
  — RTM
  — PSM
  — ORTM
  — MBC
  — TVM
  — ORTN
  — NTA
  — PTV
  — Al-Kass
  — SBC
  — RTS
  — SLBC
  — ATV
  — AZAMTV
  — TVT
  — TRT Avaz and TRT Spor.
  — UBC

External links

 Official website
 National Olympic Committee of Azerbaijan

References

 
Islamic Solidarity Games
Islamic Solidarity Games
Multi-sport events in Azerbaijan
International sports competitions hosted by Azerbaijan
Sports competitions in Baku
2010s in Baku
2017 in Azerbaijani sport
2017 in Islam
May 2017 sports events in Asia
May 2017 sports events in Europe